Karl Brunner may refer to:

Karl Brunner (economist) (1916–1989), Swiss economist
Karl Brunner (luger) (born 1951), Italian Olympic luger
Karl Brunner (SS general) (1900–1980), SS general